Black and Blue is the 13th British and 15th American studio album by the English rock band the Rolling Stones, released on 23 April 1976 by Rolling Stones Records.

This album was the first recorded after former guitarist Mick Taylor quit in December 1974. As he had done the previous time the Stones were between second guitarists in 1968, Keith Richards recorded the bulk of the guitar parts himself, though the album recording sessions also served as an audition for Taylor's replacement. Richards said of the album that it was used for "rehearsing guitar players, that's what that one was about." Numerous guitarists showed up to auditions; those who appeared on the album were Wayne Perkins, Harvey Mandel, and Ronnie Wood. Wood had previously contributed to the title track from the It's Only Rock 'n Roll album, and became a temporary touring member of the Stones in 1975 and official member in 1976. The Stones rhythm section of bassist Bill Wyman and drummer Charlie Watts appear on nearly all tracks, and frequent collaborators Nicky Hopkins and Billy Preston play keyboards on most of the album, with percussionist Ollie E. Brown also appearing on about half of the tracks. The album was the second to be self-produced, credited to "The Glimmer Twins", a pseudonym used by Jagger and Richards for their roles as producers.

Black and Blue showed the band blending its traditional rock and roll style with heavy influences from reggae and funk music. Only one single from the album, "Fool to Cry", had any significant chart success, and reception to the album was mixed. The album received a few positive reviews at the time of release, though many reviewers found it mostly forgettable, and tended to rank it very low compared to prior Stones releases. Retrospective reviews from more recent publications such as AllMusic have been kinder to the album, with critic Stephen Thomas Erlewine stating that the album's "being longer on grooves and jams than songs" ended up being "what's good about it".

History
The Rolling Stones returned to Munich, Germany, in December 1974—where they had recorded their previous album It's Only Rock 'n' Roll—and began the recording of their new album at Musicland Studios, with Mick Jagger and Keith Richards (as the Glimmer Twins) producing again. With a view to releasing it in time for a summer 1975 Tour of the Americas, the band broke for the holidays and returned in January in Rotterdam, Netherlands, to continue working—all the while auditioning new guitarists as they recorded. Among the hopefuls were Steve Marriott, Harvey Mandel, Wayne Perkins, Peter Frampton, and Ronnie Wood (although only Mandel, Perkins and Wood's guitar work would appear on the finished album). Guitar heroes Rory Gallagher and Jeff Beck both went over for a jam with the band "just to see what was going on," but both declined interest in joining the group, happy with their solo careers. Jeff Beck stated that, "in two hours I got to play three chords – I need a little more energy than that." Beck's jamming with the Stones remains unreleased to date, but is available on bootleg recordings. With much work to follow, it was decided to delay the album for the following year and release the Made in the Shade compilation instead. "Cherry Oh Baby" (which was a cover version of Eric Donaldson's 1971 reggae song) would be the only song from the upcoming album sporadically played on the 1975 Tour of the Americas.

Following the conclusion of the tour, the band went to Montreux, Switzerland, in October for some overdub work, returning to Musicland Studios in Munich in December to perform similar work. After some final touch-ups, Black and Blue was completed in New York City in February 1976. That month the Stones flew to Sanibel Island Beach on Sanibel Island, Florida, to be photographed by fashion photographer Hiro for the album cover art.

Stylistically, Black and Blue embraces hard rock with "Hand of Fate" (solo by Wayne Perkins) and "Crazy Mama"; funk with "Hot Stuff" (solo by Harve Mandel); reggae with their cover of "Cherry Oh Baby" (Ronnie Wood and Keith Richards weaving guitars); and blues with "Melody," featuring the talents of Billy Preston – a heavy contributor to the album. Musical and thematic styles were merged on the seven-minute "Memory Motel," with both Jagger and Richards contributing lead vocals to a love song embedded within a life-on-the-road tale.

While all the album's songs except "Cherry Oh Baby" were officially credited to Jagger/Richards as authors, the credit for "Hey Negrita" specifies "Inspiration by Ron Wood" and "Melody" lists "Inspiration by Billy Preston". Bill Wyman would later release a version of "Melody" with his Rhythm Kings, crediting Preston as author. "Melody" is based on "Do You Love Me" by Billy Preston and Bruce Fisher, from Preston's 1973 album Everybody Likes Some Kind of Music. The only song to include both session players Wayne Perkins and Harvey Mandel is Memory Motel where Perkins plays acoustic, Mandel electric, but without a guitar solo.

Two extra tracks recorded in the Rotterdam sessions were later released on 1981's Tattoo You: "Slave" and "Worried About You" (guitar solo by Wayne Perkins).

Release and reception

Released in April 1976 — with "Fool to Cry", a worldwide top 10 hit, as its lead single — Black and Blue reached No. 2 in the UK and spent an interrupted four-week spell at number 1 in the United States, going platinum there.

The album was promoted with a controversial billboard on Sunset Boulevard in Hollywood that depicted the model Anita Russell, bound by Jagger under the phrase "I'm Black and Blue from the Rolling Stones – and I love it!" The billboard was removed after protests by the feminist group Women Against Violence Against Women, although it earned the band widespread press coverage.

Critical view was polarised. Lester Bangs wrote in Creem that "the heat's off, because it's all over, they really don't matter anymore or stand for anything [...] this is the first meaningless Rolling Stones album, and thank God". However, Robert Christgau gave the album an A−, commending the band for taking risks. Christgau singled out "Hot Stuff" and "Fool to Cry" for particular praise before concluding: "diagnosis: not dead by a long shot".

In 2000 it was voted number 536 in Colin Larkin's All Time Top 1000 Albums.

In 1994, Black and Blue was remastered and reissued by Virgin Records, again in 2009 by Universal Music, and once more in 2011 by Universal Music Enterprises in a Japanese-only SHM-SACD version. The 1994 remaster was initially released in a Collector's Edition CD, which replicated in miniature many elements of the original gatefold album packaging.

Track listing

Personnel

 Track numbers noted in parenthesis below are based on the CD track numbering.

The Rolling Stones
Mick Jagger – lead vocals , backing vocals , percussion , piano , electric piano , electric guitar 
Keith Richards – electric guitar , backing vocals , electric piano , bass guitar and piano , co-lead vocals 
Bill Wyman – bass guitar , percussion 
Charlie Watts – drums , percussion 

Additional personnel
Billy Preston – piano , organ , electric piano, synthesizer , percussion , backing vocals 
Nicky Hopkins – piano and synthesizer , organ 
Harvey Mandel – electric guitar 
Wayne Perkins – electric guitar , acoustic guitar 
Ronnie Wood – electric guitar , backing vocals 
Ollie E. Brown – percussion 
Ian Stewart – percussion 
Arif Mardin – horn arrangement 

Technical
Engineers – Keith Harwood, Glyn Johns, Phil McDonald, Lew Hahn (edit)
Assistant engineers – Jeremy Gee, Dave Richards, Tapani Tapanainen, Steve Dowd, Gene Paul
Lee Hulko – LP mastering at Sterling Sound (original 1976)
Robert Ludwig – CD mastering at Gateway Mastering Studios (1994 Virgin issue)
Bea Fleiter – art director
Hiro – photograph

Charts

Weekly charts

Year-end charts

Certifications

References

External links

1976 albums
The Rolling Stones albums
Albums produced by the Glimmer Twins
Atlantic Records albums
Rolling Stones Records albums
Virgin Records albums